Büyükşehir Belediyesi Spor Kulübü (literally Metropolitan Municipality Sports Club), or just Büyükşehir Belediyespor  may refer to:
Antalya Büyükşehir Belediyesi, Sports Club most notable for its men's basketball team
Gaziantep Büyükşehir Belediyespor, Sports Club most notable for its men's association football team
İstanbul Büyükşehir Belediyesi S.K., Sports Club of Istanbul Municipality
Kocaeli Büyükşehir Belediyesi Kağıt Spor Kulübü
Kocaeli Büyükşehir Belediyesi Kağıt S.K. Men's Ice Hockey
Mersin BB, Sports Club most notable for its men's basketball team
Mersin Büyükşehir Belediyesi S.K. Women's Basketball, article for women team